In Round 16, 2001, an Australian rules football home-and-away match was played between  and the Kangaroos at the Melbourne Cricket Ground on 22 July 2001. The match saw the largest successful comeback in the history of the Australian Football League, with Essendon winning by twelve points after trailing by 69 points midway through the second quarter; and, was one of the highest scoring games in the league's history. It is considered the best game of football ever played by some observers.

Background
Essendon went into the match placed first on the ladder with a record of 13–2, while the Kangaroos were placed ninth with a record of 8–7. The match was crucial to the Kangaroos' chances of reaching the finals in 2001.

Essendon and the Kangaroos (known as North Melbourne until 1998, and again since 2008) had been two of the best teams of the era, winning three of the previous five premierships between them: the Kangaroos in 1996 and 1999, and Essendon in 2000. Both clubs had finished in the top four for the previous two seasons. The 2001 season was seeing a decline for the Kangaroos, while Essendon was on target to win a third consecutive minor premiership.

Essendon had comfortably won the previous five encounters between the clubs – the last two of those by 125 points and 85 points – and there was recent bad blood between the teams when Essendon coach Kevin Sheedy had described the Kangaroos executives as 'marshmallows' in 1998. The formline, the clubs' respective positions on the ladder, and the absences of captain Wayne Carey, midfielder Anthony Stevens and full back Mick Martyn from the Kangaroos' team, meant that Essendon was a warm favourite to win.

Match summary

Each team opened the game with one goal, and Essendon led by one point after seven minutes of play. Thereafter, the Kangaroos dominated scoring in the opening quarter, kicking eleven more goals – and a behind in the final minute of play – including the last eight goals of the quarter, to lead by 58 points at quarter time, 12.1 (73) to 2.3 (15). Saverio Rocca kicked four goals in the quarter, and so efficient was the Kangaroos' attack that its thirteen scores came from only nineteen inside-50s. Essendon's champion full back Dustin Fletcher began the game in the forward pocket as an experiment, but was moved back to the backline after only fifteen minutes as the Kangaroos built up a lead. In the quarter time huddle, Essendon captain James Hird intercepted the team before coach Kevin Sheedy was able to launch into a tirade, delivering a measured message to the team to focus on working back into the game.

After kicking three of the first four goals of the second quarter, the Kangaroos extended the lead to its game-high 69 points, leading 15.1 (91) to Essendon's 3.4 (22), in the tenth minute of the second quarter. Over the following twenty minutes of play, Essendon kicked nine consecutive goals without the Kangaroos managing a score, to narrow the margin to only 15 points. The second of those goals, a dribbling shot by Hird from a tight angle after being crunched while taking a mark, was said to have been one of the main inspirations for the comeback. Matthew Lloyd kicked five of Essendon's ten second-quarter goals. David Teague kicked a goal for the Kangaroos after the half-time siren to break Essendon's run and extend the margin to 21 points at half-time: Kangaroos 16.1 (97) led Essendon 12.4 (76).

Essendon opened the third quarter most strongly, and in the first eight minutes kicked 2.3 (15) to narrow the margin to only six points, before the Kangaroos kicked the next two goals to extend the margin back to 19 points. Essendon kicked four of the next five goals to narrow the margin to only one point at the 27-minute mark, and the Kangaroos responded with three out of the four goals kicked after that point, re-establishing a 14-point lead. After kicking six goals to Essendon's seven, the Kangaroos 22.4 (136) led Essendon 19.8 (122) at three-quarter time.

In the final quarter, Lloyd kicked his ninth goal of the game in the opening minute, and a goal by Ramanauskas in the fifth minute narrowed Essendon's deficit to three points. The Kangaroos had four difficult chances early in the quarter, managing only 1.3 (9) with Brent Harvey's long-range torpedo punted goal in the 8th minute the only goal among them, giving the Kangaroos an eleven point advantage, 22.7 (145) led 21.8 (134), in the ninth minute. Essendon then kicked two quick goals – a long goal on the run by Jason Johnson (10th minute) and a 30m set shot by Gary Moorcroft (12th minute) – to take the lead for the first time since the first quarter. The Kangaroos missed two chances in the 15th and 16th minutes – a long-range shot by Jason McCartney for a behind, and a miskicked snapshot by Shannon Motlop from the top of the goal square failed to make the distance. Essendon then kicked three goals in three minutes – to Cory McGrath, Blake Caracella and Gary Moorcroft – to open a 19-point advantage entering time-on. The Kangaroos quickly responded, Corey McKernan moving from the ruck to the forward line and kicking two goals in a minute to bring the margin back to seven points at the 23 minute mark. The Kangaroos continued to attack: a long shot by David King failed to score, and a rare but critical free kick against Brady Rawlings for throwing the ball away from the boundary umpire denied the Kangaroos an attacking throw-in opportunity. Corey McKernan took a big pack mark 40m from goal in the 28th minute, but missed for a behind to narrow the margin to six points. Overall, this period seven minutes of sustained Kangaroos attack had netted 2.1 (13), before Essendon managed a rebound ending with a goal to Caracella, extending the margin to 12 points in the 29th minute. There was no further scoring, and after kicking 8.1 (49) to 3.5 (23) in the final quarter, Essendon completed a 12 point win, 27.9 (171) def. 25.9 (159). The win ensured Essendon remained on top of the ladder and kept the Kangaroos outside the top eight.

Essendon's Jason Johnson was considered the best on the ground, in what was considered the best game of his career, and he polled three Brownlow Medal votes. He had 31 disposals, 13 clearances, 10 inside-50s and kicked four goals to be the most valuable in Essendon's comeback, despite dealing personally with the bereavement of having lost a friend in a car accident days earlier.

Scoreboard

Details

Records
Essendon's win set a new record for the greatest comeback in AFL history, having trailed by 69 points at the 12 minute mark of the second quarter, before recovering to win by 12 points.

The teams' combined score of 52.18 (330) was only fifteen points short of the all-time record, and as of 2022 stands as the seventh-highest scoring game of all time.

The Kangaroos' first quarter score of 12.1 (73) was, at the time, the fourth-highest quarter time score of all time; and the 58 point deficit was the greatest margin by which Essendon had ever trailed a match at quarter time – two records which further underscored the extent of Essendon's comeback.

Aftermath
Both clubs finished the season indifferently after this match. Of Essendon's last six matches in the home-and-away season, it won just three, enough to secure the minor premiership for the third consecutive year. The Kangaroos won just one more match for the season and slid to 13th on the ladder. After this game, the Kangaroos won their next six matches against Essendon; it was not until Round 1, 2008, that Essendon defeated the Kangaroos (who by then had reverted to its old name "North Melbourne") again.

Legacy
After the game, the game was quickly heralded as one of the best, if not the best, game in VFL/AFL history. So high was the interest in the game that it was replayed in full on Channel Seven in Melbourne the following day, following The Weakest Link, something which had never previously occurred – at the time, it was usual only to broadcast the edited highlights of any Sunday afternoon match played in Victoria.

Writing for the Herald Sun, Mark Robinson declared: “Amid the euphoria of victory and emptiness of defeat, there’s only one question to be asked: was this the greatest game of all time? The answer is almost certainly yes. If it was a Grand Final there would be no doubt." North Melbourne's Corey McKernan placed it equal with a match he played against the Western Bulldogs in 1998, while many other players declared it the best ever.

Later in 2001, Garry Lyon won a media award for his expert radio call of the game on 3AW. During the call, Lyon had made a prediction that Essendon would come back and win early in the second term when the margin exceeded 10 goals.

See also
2001 AFL season
Essendon–North Melbourne rivalry
Miracle on Grass (Australian rules football)

References

External links
Round 16 2001 Essendon vs North Melbourne - FinalSiren.com
Full match on YouTube

Australian Football League games
Essendon Football Club
North Melbourne Football Club